György Orbán (born 12 July 1947 in Târgu Mureș, Romania) is a Romanian-born Hungarian composer.

Biography
Orbán studied then taught at the Cluj-Napoca Academy of Music until 1979 when he emigrated from Romania to Hungary, becoming  professor of composition at the Liszt Academy of Music, Budapest, in 1982. His choral music mixes traditional liturgical renaissance and baroque counterpoint with intrusions from jazz.

Works, editions, recordings

Recordings
Monographs
 Orban: Hungarian Passion. Bartók Béla Chorus and University Orchestra dir. Gábor Baross HCD31824 Hungaroton
 Cantico di frate sole. Mass no 11: Benedictus. Razumovsky Trilogy. Zsuzsa Alföldi (Soprano)   Reményi Ede Chamber Orchestra Hungaroton
Collections
 György Orbán: Magnificat; Péter Tóth: Hymnus de Magna Hungariae Regina; Kodály: My Heart Aches and  Kálló Double Dance. Gábor Baross and Béla Bartók Choir of the Eötvös Lóránd University (2009)
 Ex Oriente Lux: Choir Masterpieces from Northern and Eastern Europe: Knut Nystedt, György Orbán, József Karai,  Lajos Bárdos, Sergei Rachmaninov, Urmas Sisask, Arvo Pärt, Petr Eben, Mircea Diaconescu, Krzysztof Penderecki, Tchaikovsky, Alexander Gretchaninov, Doru Popovici. Carmina Mundi dir. Harald Nickoll Audite 97.475 	
 Wind Quintets - Endre Szervánszky, György Ligeti, György Kurtág, György Orbán. Berlin Philharmonic Wind Quintet (1994)  BIS-CD-662
 Musica Sacra Hungarica - László Halmos, Ferenc Farkas, Zoltán Kodály, György Orbán, Lajos Bárdos, Gábor Lisznyai, Arthur Harmat, Ferenc Kersch, György Deák-Bárdos. Budapest Madrigal Choir  Eva Kollar Carus 2.151-99
 Choral songs on Shakespeare texts - Orpheus with his lute. O mistress mine. With works by Robert Applebaum, Matthew Harris (composer), Juhani Komulainen, Nils Lindberg, Jaakko Mäntyjärvi, Kevin Olson (composer), Håkan Parkman, John Rutter, Martha Sullivan, Chicago a cappella dir. Trevor Mitchell, Cedille
 Orban, György Selmeczy: Contemporary Hungarian Masses  Hungaroton
 Songs - Orbán Spanish songs. Songs to words by Sándor Weöres. János Vajda, Songs to words by Géza Szöcs: Andrea Meláth (mezzo-soprano), Emese Virág (piano). HCD31827  Hungaroton
 Musica Nostra - Choral Music Alberto Balzanelli (Argentina), Miklós Kocsár, Péter Nógrádi, Miklós Sugár, Erzsébet Szőnyi György Orbán, József Karai, Ferenc Farkas, Petr Eben, Augustin Kubizek. HCD31840  Hungaroton
 János Vajda: Missa in A, Orban: Missa prima  HCD31929 Hungaroton
 Miklós Kocsár, Miklós Mohay, Erzsébet Szőnyi, Levente Gyöngyösi, Zoltán Gárdonyi	HCD32190 Hungaroton

References

External links

 György Orbán: Biography and list of works at the Budapest Music Center

Hungarian composers
Hungarian male composers
1947 births
People from Târgu Mureș
Living people